Kushkuiyeh or Kushkuyeh may refer to:
 Kushkuiyeh, Isfahan
 Kushkuiyeh, Kerman
 Kushkuiyeh, Zarand, Kerman Province

See also
 Kashkuiyeh (disambiguation)